The Ford House is a Georgian Revival former home (now a commercial building) built c. 1835.  The most famous resident, Antonia Ford, was a spy for the  Confederate States Army during the American Civil War.  It was placed on the National Register of Historic Places in 1987 as part of the City of Fairfax Historic District.

Antonia Ford

Born and raised in Fairfax, Virginia, Antonia Ford was able to remain in the town once occupied by Union forces in mid-1861.  Ford was able to gain intelligence from Union troops, which she passed on to Confederate leaders.  She was eventually discovered and arrested on March 13, and incarcerated in Washington, D.C. at the Old Capitol Prison.

Notes

External links 

National Register of Historic Places in Fairfax, Virginia
Georgian Revival architecture in Virginia
Houses on the National Register of Historic Places in Virginia
Houses completed in 1835
Houses in Fairfax, Virginia
Historic district contributing properties in Virginia